Mugen, a word of Japanese origin meaning "infinite", may refer to:

"Mugen" (Nana Mizuki song), 2009
"Mugen" (Porno Graffitti song), 2002
M.U.G.E.N, a freeware 2D fighting game engine
Mugen Motorsports, a Japanese automotive company
Mugen Seiki, a Japanese manufacturer of radio-controlled cars
Mugen (town), in Guiping, Guangxi, China
Mugen, a character in the Japanese anime series Samurai Champloo
 Mugen, a realm or plane of existence that contains an infinite space